Milan Aleksić, nicknamed Miša (Миша), known by his nom de guerre Marinko (Маринко), was a Serbian Chetnik active from 1905 to 1918. He was born in Raška, at the time part of the Ottoman Empire. He fled Ottoman tyranny to Kuršumlija, in the Kingdom of Serbia, where he graduated from the Military Academy as a non-commissioned officer. He joined the Serbian Chetnik Organization in 1905, fighting under Jovan Babunski and Gligor Sokolović in Poreč and on the Babuna against Bulgarian and Albanian bands. He was an assistant of the Upper Staff of Panta Radosavljević-Dunavski, Nikola Janković-Kosovski and Pavle Blažarić as a non-commissioned officer. In 1908, he worked with Vojislav Tankosić in training volunteers in Bosnia. He is regarded a hero in all wars between 1912 and 1918, during which he had the rank of lieutenant colonel. He wore an Albanian costume during battle in order to confuse the enemy. He died of exhaustion in Veliki Bečkerek (modern Zrenjanin), in Banat, on May 27, 1923.

Gallery

References

20th-century Serbian people
Serbian military leaders
1923 deaths
People from Raška District
Chetniks of the Macedonian Struggle
Serbian military personnel of the Balkan Wars
Serbian military personnel of World War I
1876 births
Royal Serbian Army soldiers
Emigrants from the Ottoman Empire to Serbia
Emigrants from the Ottoman Empire to the Kingdom of Serbia